Saitama Prefectural Kasukabe High School (埼玉県立春日部高等学校 Saitama-kenritsu Kasukabe Kōtōgakkō) is a secondary school located in Kasukabe, Saitama, Japan. Founded in 1899, the School incorporates the Maltese Cross in its emblem.

The School has developed several student exchange schemes with Melbourne High School, since 1997  with Westfields Sports High School, Australia, and from 2007 with Haddonfield Memorial High School, New Jersey, United States.

References

External links
 Official site

High schools in Saitama Prefecture
Schools in Saitama Prefecture
Educational institutions established in 1899
1899 establishments in Japan
Kasukabe, Saitama